Rupanjali Shastri (born 14 November 1975) is an Indian former cricketer who played as a right-handed batter and right-arm off break bowler. She appeared in one Test match and 12 One Day Internationals for India in 1999 and 2000. She played domestic cricket for Madhya Pradesh, Air India and Railways.

References

External links
 
 

Living people
1975 births
Cricketers from Indore
Indian women cricketers
India women Test cricketers
India women One Day International cricketers
Madhya Pradesh women cricketers
Air India women cricketers
Railways women cricketers
Central Zone women cricketers
East Zone women cricketers
20th-century Indian women
20th-century Indian people
21st-century Indian women
21st-century Indian people